The Australia national badminton team represents Australia in international badminton team competitions. The national team is controlled by Badminton Australia, the top governing body for badminton in the country.

They have yet to reach any semifinal at the team events in the international stage, that includes the Thomas Cup, Uber Cup and the Sudirman Cup.

History 
Australia's badminton history first began in 1900, when the sport was played and was considered a popular pastime for church groups which played the game in church halls. In 1932, Badminton Australia was established which led to the formation of the national team. Nicknamed the Falcons, the Australian team made their international team debut when the men's team competed in the 1955 Thomas Cup.

Men's team 
Australia qualified for their first Thomas Cup in 1955 after defeating New Zealand 7–2 in the Australasian zone qualifiers. The team then lost 0–9 to Denmark in the inter-zone playoffs. In the 1961 Thomas Cup, the Australian team failed to advance further after losing the first round to Thailand.

After 49 years, Australia qualified for the Thomas Cup once again in 2010 after being crowned champions at the 2010 Oceania Men's Team Championships. The team were eliminated in the group stages after losing to Indonesia and India in Group D. The team failed to qualify for the next two editions of the championships but returned to the 2018 Thomas Cup. The team lost all their matches in Group A against China, France and India.

In 2020, the team qualified for the 2020 Thomas Cup but withdrew from the competition due to travel costs and quarantine restrictions in the country. The team were then replaced by Tahiti.

Women's team 
The Australian women's team made their Uber Cup debut in 1975 after defeating New Zealand. The team missed their chances of entering the second round after losing narrowly to Canada. 

The Australian women's team won every Oceania Women's Team Championships and qualified for the Uber Cup consecutively in the 2010s. In 2020, the women's team withdrew from the 2020 Thomas & Uber Cup along with the men's team.

Mixed team 
The Australian mixed team first competed in the 1982 Commonwealth Games. The team won third place after winning against New Zealand in the bronze-medal tie. The team won third place for a second time in 1986 after a close battle against Scotland. In 1989, the team competed in the inaugural edition of the Sudirman Cup. The team lost 1–4 to Scotland but managed to win 3–2 against Germany and Poland to claim 16th place in the final standings. The team won the first two Oceania Mixed Team Championships in 1999 and 2002. The team won every mixed team title in the 2010s.

The mixed team continued their win streak by winning the Oceania Mixed Team Championships for the sixth time in 2023. This qualified them for the 2023 Sudirman Cup in Suzhou.

Competitive record

Thomas Cup

Uber Cup

Sudirman Cup

Commonwealth Games

Women's team

Mixed team

Oceania Team Championships

Despite Australia having yet to be a competitive country in badminton, the nation is currently the most dominant in Oceania, winning a total of 16 team titles at the Oceania Badminton Championships, as of 2022.

Men's team

Mixed team

Junior competitive record

Suhandinata Cup

Oceania Junior Team Championships

Mixed team

Commonwealth Youth Games

Mixed team

Players

Current squad

Men's team

Women's team

References 

Badminton
National badminton teams
Badminton in Australia